William Jolly was an Australian politician.

William Jolly or Jolley may also refer to:

William Jolly (Leicester MP) represented Leicester (UK Parliament constituency)
Willie Jolley

See also